Ap Tau Pai is a small island between Yan Chau Tong and Crooked Harbour in the north-eastern New Territories of Hong Kong. It is located in Ap Chau Bay, North-east of Hong Kong. It is under the administration of North District.

See also 

 Islands and peninsulas of Hong Kong

References 

Uninhabited islands of Hong Kong
North District, Hong Kong
Islands of Hong Kong